Nyctia is a genus of true flies in the family Sarcophagidae.

Species
N. gilbochaeta Lehrer, 2005
N. halterata (Panzer, 1798)
N. lagnesia Lehrer, 2005
N. lunubris (Macquart, 1843)

References 

Sarcophagidae
Schizophora genera